Coptotermes ceylonicus, is a species of subterranean termite of the genus Coptotermes. It is native to India and Sri Lanka. It is a common wood destroying termites, which damage to logs, woodens structures of both natural and man-made. It is a pest of many economically valuable trees such as Hevea brasiliensis and Camellia sinensis, and also an inhabitant of Anacardium occidentale, Cocos nucifera, Ficus fergusonii, Gliricidia sepium, Grevillea robusta, Madhuca longifolia, Tamarindus indica and Theobroma cacao.

References

External links
Current Status of Coptotermes Wasmann

Termites
Insects described in 1911
Arthropods of India